Mark Wilkinson (born 1952) is an English cover art designer and illustrator.

Mark or Marc Wilkinson may also refer to:

 Mark Wilkinson (designer) (1950–2017), English furniture designer
 Mark Wilkinson (singer), English-born Australian singer-songwriter
 Mark Wilkinson (rugby union) (born 1977), English former rugby union player
 Marc Wilkinson (1929-2022), Australian composer and conductor
 Wilkinson (musician) (born 1989), Mark Wilkinson, British Dj and producer better known by the stage name Wilkinson